River Bend is an unincorporated area in Kanawha County,  West Virginia,  United States.

The community was part of the Upper Falls census-designated place from 2010 until 2020.

Residents receive mail using the city name Saint Albans at ZIP Code 25177.

River Bend is in the Charleston, West Virginia metropolitan area.

References 

Unincorporated communities in West Virginia
Unincorporated communities in Kanawha County, West Virginia